The  is the prefectural parliament of Tokyo Metropolis.

Its 127 members are elected every four years in 42 districts by single non-transferable vote. 23 electoral districts equal the special wards, another 18 districts are made up by the cities, towns and villages in the Western part of the prefecture, one district consists of the outlying islands (Ogasawara and Izu Islands).

The assembly is responsible for enacting and amending prefectural ordinances, approving the budget (5.7 billion yen in fiscal 2007) and voting on important administrative appointments made by the governor including the vice governors.

Due to the special nature of the Tokyo Metropolis compared to other prefectures, the Tokyo Metropolitan Assembly has certain powers that would usually fall into the responsibilities of municipal parliaments. This is to ensure efficient and unified urban administration for the 23 special wards that cover the former Tokyo City and comprise the urban core of the Greater Tokyo Area.

Current composition 

The 2021 Tokyo prefectural election took place on 4 July 2021. As of 23 July 2021, the assembly is composed as follows:

Electoral districts 
Most electoral districts correspond to current municipalities, but several districts correspond to former counties (the counties, abolished as administrative unit in 1921, had initially by definition served as electoral districts for prefectural assemblies in the Empire), namely the West Tama (Nishi-Tama), North Tama (Kita-Tama) and South Tama (Minimi-Tama) counties. The towns and villages on the islands have never been subordinate to counties, but to four subprefectures that together form the islands electoral district.

Heckling incident 
On June 18, 2014, an assemblywoman, Ayaka Shiomura, was heckled in the Tokyo Metropolitan Assembly meeting when she asked questions about how to save women who have difficulty in pregnancy and childbirth. The Japanese media, along with various members of society both condemned and also excused the heckling. Media overseas, such as CNN, BBC, and others, also criticized the heckling and reported on the endemic sexism that made such a thing possible, while the Japanese media tended to present it as a one-time case of sexual harassment. On June 23, assembly member Akihiro Suzuki came forward and made a formal, public apology, admitting he was one of the people who heckled Shiomura. The fact that a member of the LDP ruling party apologized publicly was seen as very big deal.  Other hecklers never came forward.  On June 25, the assembly passed a resolution, aiming to restore the trust, and to finish the problem.

Background 

Before Shiomura became a broadcast writer, then later becoming a member of Your Party, she was a bikini model. When she was a bikini model, she appeared on Koi no karasawagi, a TV program (Nippon TV).
Akihiro Suzuki is first elected in Tokyo Metropolitan Assembly election in 2007. In the Metropolitan Assembly, it has acted as the Committee on General Affairs vice chairman or the acting Liberal Democratic Party chairman of the Policy Research Council. Suzuki had hung up "a substantial aid for childcare" and "realization of the society in which women is very easy to work" contrary to the contents of heckling which he did to her.
Moreover, Suzuki approved of the plan to purchase the Senkaku Islands (Ishigaki city, Okinawa) in August 2012.
For the purpose of investigation of the Senkaku Islands, he swam from the ship, while he had been allowed to, and he landed at Uoturijima island, and he was investigated by the Okinawa Prefectural Police on suspicion of a misdemeanor.

Heckling 
The hecklings with which assemblywoman Shiomura were bombarded are as follows; "Umenai no ka (Can't you bear a baby?)", "Kekkon shiro (Get married)". Assemblyman Suzuki claimed the former, but it was not clear who stated the latter. Yōichi Masuzoe, the Governor of Tokyo Metropolis, and other member of the assembly were drawn in by the heckling and took part. Hecklings are variable; sometime a heckling encourages the speaker and another time it injures the speaker. There has been the train of thought that heckling can "give humor" and make discussion smooth since past World War II. Thus, some people think of heckling as good. Morita Minoru, a Japanese political commentator, pointed out that although heckling has been since past, political leaders get bad at heckling other members, and the number of "vulgar heckles" has increased. There are various arguments on whether or not this is sexism. For example, Tabojin Toshio, who ran for the latest Tokyo Metropolitan Assembly election, said that he did not understand why this is considered sexism (2014).

Investigations 
On June 30, Shiomura submitted to the Tokyo chairperson the requisition. The requisition stated the person who took part in the heckling incident should be punished. However, the requisition was rejected due to lack of evidence. Therefore, Your Party (minna no to) planned to specify the man who heckled Shiomura by analyzing a voiceprint. When Suzuki was asked about the heckling incident on June 20, Suzuki denied the relationship with heckling completely. The Metropolitan-Assembly Liberal Democratic Party held the affiliation lawmaker's general meeting on the 23rd and conducted press conference in the afternoon. Metropolitan-Assembly Liberal Democratic Party Secretary-General Osamu Yoshiwara said that the man who heckled Shiomura was Suzuki Akihiro, a member of the Metropolitan Assembly.

Effects 
All of the female members of the Metropolitan Assembly demanded that such hooting should be legislated. Moreover, Your Party claimed that the people who mocked Shiomura should be identified. More than 1,000 protestations against the hooting were sent to the Metropolitan Assembly. On Twitter, BBS, and so on, many people mentioned the incident. Most of them radically criticized the sexist abuse. This problem has been focused on not only in Japan, but also in other countries. For example, the Guardian, Reuters, and the Wall Street Journal analyzed and criticized this sexist abuse.

This incident has influenced the Cabinet support rate. The support rate of Liberal Democratic Party, which is one of the major political party in Japan and has been in power since 2012, decreased as well. In contrast, the support rate for Your Party rose.

After the incident happened, politicians have refrained from hooting during discussions. Some people analyzed that the incident was likely to influence 2020 Summer Olympics.

See also

Tokyo Metropolitan Government

References

External links
 Tokyo Metropolitan Assembly 
 Electoral Commission of the Tokyo Metropolitan Government 
 Organizational Structure of TMG

Prefectural assemblies of Japan